CGT can refer to:
 Canada's Got Talent
 General Confederation of Labour, various labour unions, initials in Latin-based languages
 General Confederation of Labour (France)
 California Guitar Trio
 Capital gains tax
 Combinatorial game theory
 Compagnie générale transaérienne, a French airline (1909–21)
 Compagnie Générale Transatlantique, or French Line
 Compagnie générale transsaharienne, Saharan transport company 
 Compensated gross tonnage